Deutsche Schule Alexander von Humboldt may refer to:
 Colegio Alemán Alexander von Humboldt (Mexico City)
 Colegio Humboldt Puebla
 Colegio Humboldt (Costa Rica)
 Deutsche Schule Lima Alexander von Humboldt
 Alexander von Humboldt Schule Montréal